In algebraic number theory, Minkowski's bound gives an upper bound of the norm of ideals to be checked in order to determine the class number of a number field K. It is named for the mathematician Hermann Minkowski.

Definition
Then every class in the ideal class group of K contains an integral ideal of norm not exceeding Minkowski's bound

Minkowski's constant for the field K is this bound MK.

Properties
Since the number of integral ideals of given norm is finite, the finiteness of the class number is an immediate consequence, and further, the ideal class group is generated by the prime ideals of norm at most MK.

Minkowski's bound may be used to derive a lower bound for the discriminant of a field K given n, r1 and r2.  Since an integral ideal has norm at least one, we have 1 ≤ MK, so that

For n at least 2, it is easy to show that the lower bound is greater than 1, so we obtain Minkowski's Theorem, that the discriminant of every number field, other than Q, is non-trivial.  This implies that the field of rational numbers has no unramified extension.

Proof
The result is a consequence of Minkowski's theorem.

References

External links
 
Stevenhagen, Peter. Number Rings.
The Minkowski Bound at Secret Blogging Seminar

Theorems in algebraic number theory
Hermann Minkowski